Kalliala is a surname. Notable people with the surname include:

Aake Kalliala (born 1950), Finnish actor
Kaarlo Kalliala (born 1952), Finnish theologian and Bishop

Finnish-language surnames